Ponte Velha do Vouga is a bridge in Portugal. It is located in Aveiro District and has been collapsed since 2011 due to the lack of maintenance.

See also
List of bridges in Portugal

Bridges in Aveiro District
Buildings and structures in Águeda